William Julius Harris (February 3, 1868April 18, 1932) was a United States senator from the state of Georgia. He was a great-grandson of Charles Hooks, who had been a Representative from North Carolina, and son-in-law of Joseph Wheeler, Confederate General and Representative from Alabama.

Early life 
Harris was born in Cedartown in Polk County, Georgia, and attended the common schools. He graduated from the University of Georgia at Athens in 1890.

He married Julia Knox Hull Wheeler (November 27, 1870 - January 6, 1959), daughter of Joseph Wheeler.

Career
He engaged in the general insurance business and banking at Cedartown, Georgia. He served as private secretary to U.S. Senator Alexander S. Clay from 1904 to 1909.

Entering politics, Harris was elected as a Democrat to the Georgia Senate in 1911 and 1912. From 1913 to 1915 he served as appointed Director of the United States Census Bureau; he also served as Acting Secretary of the Department of Commerce from 1913 to 1915. In 1915 he resigned when he was appointed as a member of the Federal Trade Commission.

He was chairman of the FTC 1917-1918. In 1918, he was elected as a Democrat to the US Senate, and reelected in 1924 and 1930. He served in total from March 4, 1919 until his death. While in the Senate, Harris was a member of the National Forest Reservation Commission from 1929 to 1932.

He died of a heart attack in Washington, D.C. Funeral services were held in the Chamber of the United States Senate. His interment was in Greenwood Cemetery in Cedartown.

After Harris' death in 1932, the governor of Georgia, Richard Russell, Jr., declared a special election for September of that year to fill the vacant seat. Russell declared his own candidacy and won the election to replace Harris.

See also
 List of United States Congress members who died in office (1900–49)

References

Master of the Senate: The Years of Lyndon Johnson, 2002, Robert A. Caro, p. 174

External links
 

1868 births
1932 deaths
Directors of the United States Census Bureau
Democratic Party Georgia (U.S. state) state senators
University of Georgia alumni
Democratic Party United States senators from Georgia (U.S. state)
People from Cedartown, Georgia
United States Census Bureau people
State political party chairs of Georgia (U.S. state)
Woodrow Wilson administration personnel